Muppets Party Cruise is a party video game released in 2003 by Mass Media Inc. for the PlayStation 2 and GameCube consoles. The currency is party favors when unlocking additional party games from the menu, but during gameplay players use cruise credits.

This was the Muppets' last video game before the franchise was acquired by The Walt Disney Company in 2004.

Gameplay
Muppets Party Cruise has 6 playable characters: Kermit, Piggy, Animal, Fozzie, Gonzo, and Pepe. As well as 6 non-playable characters: Statler and Waldorf, Rowlf, Rizzo, Swedish Chef, Sam the Eagle, Bunsen, and Beaker. 30 mini-games, 15 of which the player has to unlock. And 5 levels: The Engine Room, Crew's Quarters, Quality Cabins, Star Suites, and Royal Staterooms. Players also have the choice between a long cruise and short cruise

In long cruise the players can freely roam around on a tiled cruise ship. They roll at the start of their round and can only go that set number of spaces. Around the walls of the cruise ship there are doors; entering the blue, red, or green ones start multiplayer mini-games (this is referenced in the Muppet's Party Rap), and entering the yellow ones reward the players with lottery-style one player games, in which the player may win more cruise credits. When a player wins a mini-game accessed via a red, blue, or green door, they receive a party favor of that color. When one player gets enough party favors the game is over and the total party favors collected by all of the players gets added to the save's balance, which can unlock mini-games.

In short cruise the first player may select a mini-game for everyone to compete in, but no party favors are won.

Story
Several famous Muppet characters are off on a long-awaited long cruise. Unfortunately for them, the magnificent Muppets find themselves stuck on the bottom deck of the boat. They develop a plan to get out, however, in which they set up fun mini-games in their cabins to earn party favors. Players use the party favors to unlock mini-games and battle their way up five decks, eventually leading to First Class.

Reception 

The game received "average" reviews, according to video game review score aggregator Metacritic.

References

2003 video games
Party video games
GameCube games
PlayStation 2 games
The Muppets video games
Video games about amphibians
Video games about pigs
Video games about bears
Video games about dogs
Video games about mice and rats
Video games developed in the United States
TDK Mediactive games
Multiplayer and single-player video games